Hélène Laporte (born 29 December 1978) is a French politician who was elected as a National Rally (part of the Identity and Democracy) group Member of the European Parliament (MEP) in the 2019 European parliamentary election. She is currently serving as vice-president of the French National Assembly.

Early life and local political career
Hélène Laporte was born on 29 December 1978 in Villeneuve-sur-Lot, France. Her mother Isabelle Laporte was elected as a National Front councillor on the Villeneuve municipal council in 2014. Her maternal grandfather Jacques Laporte was a candidate for the National Front in the 1997 French legislative election. She is a banking analyst for Crédit Agricole.

Laporte joined the National Front in 2014. In the 2015 French regional elections, she was elected as a councillor for the party in Lot-et-Garonne. Laporte contested the 2017 French legislative election in Lot-et-Garonne's 2nd constituency. Alexandre Freschi of the La République En Marche! party won the seat after the second round of voting. National Front changed their name to National Rally in June 2018.

European Parliament
Laporte stood as a candidate for National Rally in the 2019 European parliamentary election. She was second on her party's list, and was elected as one of its 22 MEPs in France. She is part of the Identity and Democracy group. In the European Parliament, Laporte is a member of the Committee on Budgets, and is part of the delegation to the Euro-Latin American Parliamentary Assembly.

Personal life
Laporte is married, and has two children.

Notes

References

1978 births
Living people
MEPs for France 2019–2024
21st-century women MEPs for France
National Rally (France) MEPs